The second USS Vedette was a United States Navy patrol vessel in commission from 1917 or 1918 to December 1918.

Vedette was built in 1914 as a civilian motorboat of the same name by the Electric Launch Company (ELCO) at Bayonne, New Jersey.  She was operating in the Panama Canal Zone as the property of the Panama Canal Company when the U.S. Navy acquired her for use as a section patrol boat during World War I. She never received a section patrol (SP) number.

Vedette served on section patrol duties in the Panama Canal Zone for the rest of World War I. The Navy returned her to the Panama Canal Company on 31 December 1918.

Vedette should not be confused with the patrol vessel , which also was in commission during World War I.

References

NavSource Online: Section Patrol Craft Photo Archive Vedette

Patrol vessels of the United States Navy
World War I patrol vessels of the United States
Ships built in Bayonne, New Jersey
1914 ships